Lankiam Cay, also known as Panata Island (Mandarin), is the smallest of the naturally occurring Spratly Islands.

The island is administered by the Philippines as part of Kalayaan, Palawan, and is the eighth largest of the Philippine-occupied islands. It is also claimed by the People's Republic of China, the Republic of China (Taiwan), and Vietnam.

Environment
It has a wide lagoon.

Philippine occupation
The island is guarded by soldiers stationed at nearby Loaita Island who regularly visit.  It is kept under observation from a tall structure on Loaita Island.

The location of this outpost, which the Philippines calls Panata Island, is often misreported as being on Lankiam Cay, to the east of Loaita Island. While reports suggest Lankiam was once a small sandy cay, it appears to have been washed away, leaving only a submerged reef and a small, shifting sand bar. If there was ever a Filipino facility there, it was moved to Loaita Cay and took the name “Panata Island” with it.

See also
Policies, activities and history of the Philippines in Spratly Islands

References

External links
Google Map of Lankiam Cay

Islands of the Spratly Islands
Kalayaan, Palawan
Loaita Bank